Turn Up The Music: The Hits of Point of Grace is the 16th album and second greatest hits album by Contemporary Christian group Point of Grace. The album reached #27 on Billboard Magazine'''s top Christian Albums on December 10, 2011.

The album was released on July 12, 2011 and features songs previously featured on 2003's 24 release, as well as songs from the albums I Choose You, How You Live, and No Changin' Us''. It also features a cover of the song "Hole in the World" by the Eagles, which was produced by Ben Shive and was also the lead single for the compilation. The album compiles songs that have won major awards; two Platinum Records; five Gold Records and chart-topping hits. It is Point of Grace's first greatest hits compilation to feature member Leigh Cappillino.

Track listing 
 "Day By Day" – 3:32
 "Circle of Friends" – 4:17
 "How You Live (Turn Up The Music)" (Acoustic Version) – 4:32
 "Blue Skies" – 4:22
 "The Great Divide" – 4:20
 "I Wish" – 3:34
 "Come To Jesus" – 3:59
 "Jesus Will Still Be There" – 4:32
 "Who Am I" – 3:36
 "I Choose You" – 4:02
 "God Is With Us" – 4:02
 "King of the World" – 4:12
 "Love and Laundry" – 3:00
 "There Is Nothing Greater Than Grace" – 4:03
 "Hole In The World" – 3:28

Single 
 "Hole In The World"

Singers 
 Shelley Breen
 Leigh Cappillino
 Denise Jones
 Terry Jones
 Heather Payne

References 

2011 greatest hits albums
Point of Grace albums